Landergin Mesa, near Vega, Texas, is an archeological site, preserving some of the most significant Texas Panhandle culture ruins. Landergin Mesa is a large site with many isolated structures, it is important because of the unique artifacts dating to the Antelope Creek Phase. There are well preserved examples of Borger Cordmarked ceramic vessels from the period. The site also exhibits unique architecture indicative of the Antelope Creek Phase.

Landergin Mesa is a mesa in Oldham County, Texas, in the watershed of the Canadian River. The top layer of the mesa is a thick sandstone, with a sheer drop around much of the mesa's circumference. The mesa's usable surface is covered by a large building remnant with many chambers. An area outside the structure is littered with evidence of domestic occupation, including manos and pottery remains. The site has regularly been subjected to archaeological vandalism by pothunters. The areas in the valley below the mesa, and other nearby landforms, also exhibit evidence of prehistoric human habitation. Radiocarbon dating places the period of occupation around 1300 CE.

See also

National Register of Historic Places listings in Oldham County, Texas
List of National Historic Landmarks in Texas

References

Additional source

National Historic Landmarks in Texas
Archaeological sites in Texas
Geography of Oldham County, Texas
Archaeological sites on the National Register of Historic Places in Texas
National Register of Historic Places in Oldham County, Texas